A group litigation order (or GLO) is an order of a court in England and Wales, which permits a number of claims which give rise to common or related issues (of fact or law) to be managed collectively.

History 
Prior to the introduction of the Civil Procedure Rules the courts of England and Wales had used a number of techniques to manage multiple claims. In particular representative claims permitted a plaintiff (now claimant) who shared the same interest in a claim as a group to either begin or continue a claim as a representative of that group. The court could also consolidate one or more claims so that they were managed or heard together.

The final Access to Justice Report, published in July 1996, concluded that these methods were not sufficiently flexible and recommended that a system for group litigation be introduced.

Group litigation orders were added to the Civil Procedure Rules from 2 May 2000.

Procedure 
Any party to a claim may apply for a group litigation order to be made before or after issue of the claim. A single court will be assigned to manage the GLO. A Group Register will then be set up listing all claims which have become part of the GLO. Any party to a case may apply to be added or removed from the group register.

All claims that from part of a GLO will be automatically allocated to the multi-track and will be moved to the management court. There is great flexibility in how group litigation may be managed and directions should be tailored to the specific needs of a particular set of claims.

Examples 
Notable cases in which such an order has been issued include the McDonald's Hot Drinks litigation in the High Court of Justice Queen's Bench Division, proceedings against the Royal Liverpool Children's Hospital in the Liverpool District Registry, and the case brought by subpostmasters against the Post Office in the British Post Office scandal.

A full list of current GLOs is available on Her Majesty's Courts Service website.

External links 
 Practice Direction 19B covering group litigation
List of Group Litigation Orders

References 

English law
Civil procedure